Charles Hayward (born 1951) is an English drummer and was a founding member of the experimental rock groups This Heat and Camberwell Now. He also played with Mal Dean's Amazing Band, Dolphin Logic, and gigged and recorded with Phil Manzanera in the group Quiet Sun project as well as a short stint with Gong. He was a session musician on The Raincoats' second album, Odyshape, and on one occasion played drums for the anarchist punk band Crass. Since the late 1980s, Hayward has released several solo projects and participated in various collaborations, most notably Massacre with Bill Laswell and Fred Frith.

Career

In 1976, Hayward and fellow musician Charles Bullen began practising with bassist Gareth Williams under the name This Heat. They began to experiment with tape loops, found sounds and keyboards on several sessions (recorded from 1976 to 1978, but not released until 1979). Finally, in 1979, This Heat released their self-titled debut album.  1981's Deceit marked the final new album from This Heat, Williams leaving just after its release. While Bullen began working as a studio engineer, Hayward did sessions for Lora Logic, The Raincoats and Everything but the Girl before forming Camberwell Now with bassist Trefor Goronwy and tape manipulator Stephen Rickard. The trio released 2 eps Meridian, Greenfingers and 1 album The Ghost Trade through the Swiss Recommended label. 

When Camberwell Now disbanded in 1987 Hayward embarked on a solo career which has continued to the present day. He debuted with Survive the Gesture (1987), Skew-whiff (1989) Switch on War (1991) and My Secret Alphabet (with Nick Doyne-Ditmas) in 1993. Three live albums recorded in Japan followed in the late 1990s (released on Japanese label Locus Solus). In 2003 Abracadabra Information was released and 2011 saw the release of ONE BIG ATOM. In 1998, he joined Massacre with Fred Frith and Bill Laswell.

Throughout the 1990s up to the present he has initiated a large number of events and performances, including the series Accidents + Emergencies at the Albany Theatre in Deptford; Out of Body Orchestra; music made using sounds from the construction of the new Laban Dance Centre (now the Trinity Laban Conservatoire of Music and Dance), which was choreographed for the institution's official opening; music for a circus (part of the National Theatre's 'Art of Regeneration''' initiative); and the full-on installation/performance Anti-Clockwise (with Ashleigh Marsh and David Aylward) for multiple strobes, maze structure of diverse textures, 2 drummers, synthesizers and your nervous system. Recent developments include the CONTINUITY evenings as part of Camberwell Arts. Over the past ten years Hayward has developed these attitudes and insights into a wide range of soundwork, both collaboratively and as a solo artist/performer. 
These include: 
30 MINUTE SNARE DRUM ROLL, Zigzag+Swirl, a solo song set at the drums using a system of controlled chance electronics, beginanywhere a set of songs centred around the piano, collaborations with Laura Cannell, Thurston Moore, Keiji Haino amongst many others. Recent work with the Islington Mill crew in the project Anonymous Bash has led to new work with many younger players, including Harmergeddon, DATA QUACK (with Ben Vince, Merlin Nova and Coby Sey) and projects for an array of new record labels including Samarbeta, Care in the Community and Unknown Gods. He also releases material on his own label CONTINUITY..... His long term relationship with the Albany continues with a twice yearly series of performances, workshops and installation, sound is sound is sound which he curates on behalf of Lewisham Arthouse.

In 2019 Whistling Arrow - a sextet comprising three members of Ex-Easter Island Head, Laura Cannell, André Bosman and Charles Hayward published an album out on 22 November via God Unknown records.

As well as his solo performance, Hayward's recent projects include:
Albert Newton with Harry Beckett, John Edwards and Pat Thomas has been playing since its first performance at Accidents and Emergencies in the mid-1990s. 
 In 1998, he joined Massacre with Fred Frith and Bill Laswell.
Clear Frame with Lol Coxhill, Hugh Hopper and Orphy Robinson
Mathilde 253 with Han-earl Park and Ian Smith
Monkey Puzzle Trio with Viv Corringham (vocals/electronics) and Nick Doyne-Ditmas (double bass). An album White World was scheduled for release in September 2010 on the Slowfoot label.
 About Group with John Coxon, Pat Thomas and Alexis Taylor 
 Oscilanz with Laura Cannell and Ralph Cumbers (aka Bass Clef)
 V4V with DJ BPM, Nick Doyne-Ditmas and Vern Edwards
 Whistling Arrow with Laura Cannell, Ex-Easter Island Head and André Bosman

Personal life

Hayward currently lives with his wife and three children, Lewis (b. 1987), Merlin (b. 1992) and Riley (b. 1996).

Discography

AlbumsSurvive the Gesture (1987) Sub RosaSkew Whiff – A Tribute to Mark Rothko (1990) Sub RosaSwitch on War (1991) Sub RosaEscape From Europe – Live in Japan vol 1 (1996) Locus SolusDouble Agent(s) – Live in Japan vol 2 (1999) Locus SolusNear + Far – Live in Japan vol 3 (1999) Locus SolusAbracadabra Information  (2004) Locus SolusLive At Tone Deaf 10-27-11 (2012) Otoacoustic, 12xFile, MP3, Album, 320One Big Atom (2011) Continuity... RecordsTrademark Ground (2012) Otoacoustic, limited edition single sided LP, 300 copiesAnonymous Bash (2014) Samarbeta Residency, LP + DVDBegin Anywhere (2019) God Unknown, LP

12" singles
Charles Hayward: Wash Rinse Spin c/w Michael Prime: Osculation (2000) These RecordsSmell Of Metal (2014) ΚΕΜΑΛ 2 x 12"

7" singles
Charles Hayward: Out Of Order c/w Beside (2000) Dot Dot Dot Music limited edition

DVD
Charles Hayward, Peter Bromley: Charles Hayward Recorded (2007) 1968 Film Group DVD-V PAL

Albums as collaboratorsee also Quiet Sun, This Heat, Camberwell Now, etc...	
Regular Music: Regular Music (1985) Rough Trade
Charles Hayward, Gigi Masin: Les Nouvelles Musiques De Chambre Volume 2 (1989) Sub Rosa
Keep the Dog: That House We Lived In (rec 1991, rel 2003) Fred Records
Charles Hayward, Nick Doyne-Ditmas: My Secret Alphabet (1993) Sub Rosa
La 1919 (Chris Cutler, Charles Hayward, Roberto Zorzi): Jouer. Spielen. To Play (1994) Materiali Sonori	
Percy Howard, Charles Hayward, Fred Frith, Bill Laswell: Meridiem (1998) Materiali Sonori
Massacre: Funny Valentine (1998) Tzadik Records
Massacre: Meltdown (2001) Tzadik
 Lol Coxhill, Charles Hayward, Hugh Hopper, Orphy Robinson,  guest cornet Robert Wyatt: Clear Frame (2007) Continuity... Records
Massacre: Lonely Heart (2007) Tzadik
Hugh Hopper, Simon Picard, Steve Franklin, Charles Hayward: Numero d'Vol (2007) Moonjune
Phil Manzanera: Firebird V11 (2008) Expression Records
Charles Hayward, John Coxon, Pat Thomas, Alexis Taylor: About (2009) Treader
Hot Chip: One Life Stand contributed drums to tracks "Hand Me Down Your Love" and "One Life Stand" and drums and chorus vocals to "Slush" (2010) Parlophone
GOL & Charles Hayward: GOL & Charles Hayward (2010) Planam
Monkey Puzzle Trio (Charles Hayward, Nick Doyne-Ditmas, Viv Corringham): White World (2010) Slowfoot 
Mathilde 253 (Charles Hayward, Han-earl Park and Ian Smith) with Lol Coxhill: Mathilde 253 (2011) Slam Productions
Massacre: Love Me Tender (2013) Tzadik
John Coxon, Charles Hayward, Ashley Wales, Rupert Clervaux, Eben Bull, Beatrice Dillon: Disarm (2013) Lisson Gallery LP limited edition
Monkey Puzzle Trio: The Pattern Familiar (2014) Slowfoot
Uneven Eleven (Charles Hayward, Guy Segers, Kawabata Makoto): Live At Cafe Oto (2015) Sub Rosa
V4V (Charles Hayward, Nick Doyne-Ditmas, others) in/out (2014) limited edition 8 disc CDR, 300 copies
Whistling Arrow: Whistling Arrow (2019) God Unknown
Charles Hayward, Harmergeddon (Fae Harmer and Nathan Greywater) Hayward Versus Harmergeddon (2020) God Unknown
Charles Hayward (with Sean O'Hagan, Orphy Robinson, Sharon Gal, Nick Doyne-Ditmas and others) Crossfade Estate (2020) Klanggallerie

Compilation albums as collaborator
Charles Hayward, Nick Doyne-Ditmas: "Where Is Chaos Now" 20m 56s, track on compilation Chaos In Expansion (1993) Sub Rosa
David Shea, Charles Hayward, Nûs: "the new world order, who decides ?" 8m 27s, "accidents & emergencies" 7m 12s, "no bones" 5m 02s, 3 tracks on compilation Sub Rosa Sessions Bari, October 1996 (1997) Sub Rosa

Compilation EPs as collaborator
Raf And O: Time Machine EP track "Time Machine" + 3 remixes include "Time Machine" (Merlin & Charles Hayward new yEAR Mix) (2014)

See also
Entelechy Arts

References

External links
 Charles Hayward's official facebook page
 Charles Hayward at MySpace
 Charles Hayward interview at Perfect Sounds Forever.
 Charles Hayward interview at Freq.org''.

English experimental musicians
English drummers
Canterbury scene
1951 births
Living people
Place of birth missing (living people)
Gong (band) members
Quiet Sun members
Massacre (experimental band) members
Blurt members
This Heat members
Camberwell Now members